Battle of the Corunna Road may refer to:

 First Battle of the Corunna Road, Spanish Civil War, 1936
 Second Battle of the Corunna Road, 1936-7
 Third Battle of the Corunna Road, 1937

See also 
 Battle of Corunna, 1809